Harold Hartshorne (September 8, 1891 – February 15, 1961) was an American ice dancer.

With partner Nettie Prantell, he was the 1937-1938 U.S. Champion and 1943 bronze medalist. With partner Sandy MacDonald, he was the 1939-1941 U.S. Champion and 1942 silver medalist. With partner Kathe Mehl, he is the 1944 U.S. silver medalist.

After his competitive career ended, Hartshorne became a skating judge. He was en route to the World Figure Skating Championships with colleagues and athletes,  when his plane (Sabena Flight 548) crashed near Brussels, Belgium, killing all on board. His wife, Louisa, was also killed in the crash.

He was one of the founders of the Skating Club of New York. At the time of his death, in 1961, he was the president of the Skating Club of New York and the U.S. Figure Skating dance committee chairman.

He attended Princeton University.

The Hartshorne Estate at 80 Oakes Road, Little Silver, New Jersey is on the list of Monmouth County Historic Sites.

In 1981, twenty years after his death, Hartshorne was inducted into the United States Figure Skating Hall of Fame.

Results

Ice Dance
(with Prantell)

(with MacDonald)

(with Mehl)

References

External links
 

1891 births
1961 deaths
American male ice dancers
Burials at Green-Wood Cemetery
People from Little Silver, New Jersey
Princeton University alumni
Victims of aviation accidents or incidents in Belgium
Victims of aviation accidents or incidents in 1961